Raphaël Lenglet (born 21 October 1976) is a French actor. He is best known for his starring roles in French police television series. On Les Bleus he plays small-time hood turned rookie policeman, Alex Moreno and on Candice Renoir he portrays Capitaine Antoine Dumas. He is also known for his starring role as Guillaume in the 2009 French horror film, High Lane.

Biography 
Raphaël Lenglet grew up in the former Picardy region before leaving, at the age of 19, to take theater classes in Paris. He first entered the public eye as a result of his starring role in the series Les Bleus (2006–2010). Since 2013, he has played the recurring role of Captain Dumas alongside Cécile Bois in the police drama Candice Renoir on France 2.

Theater

Filmography

References

External links 
 

1975 births
Living people
Actors from Metz
French male film actors
French male stage actors
French male television actors
21st-century French male actors